Keith Graham Bambridge (1 September 1935 – 15 July 2021) was an English footballer who played as an outside left in the Football League for Rotherham United, Darlington and Halifax Town. He was a member of Rotherham United's 1961 Football League Cup Final squad.

Bambridge died on 15 July 2021, at the age of 85.

References

External links
 

1935 births
2021 deaths
English footballers
Association football outside forwards
English Football League players
Rotherham United F.C. players
Darlington F.C. players
Halifax Town A.F.C. players
Footballers from Rotherham
People from Rawmarsh